A Sporting Chance is a surviving 1919 American silent drama film directed by Henry King and produced by  starring William Russell. It was distributed through Pathé Exchange. It is not to be confused with another film released a month later by Paramount called A Sporting Chance starring Ethel Clayton which is lost.

Cast
William Russell as John Stonehouse
Fritzi Brunette as Gilberte Bonheur
George Periolat as Edward Craig
J. Farrell MacDonald as Luther Ribley aka Kennedy
Lee Hill as George Cornhill
Harvey Clark as Aaron Witt
Perry Banks as Anthony James

Preservation status
 The film is still extant and available on DVD.

References

External links

1919 films
American silent feature films
Films directed by Henry King
American black-and-white films
Silent American drama films
1919 drama films
Pathé Exchange films
1910s English-language films
1910s American films